Anyós is a village in Andorra, located in the parish of La Massana and 1 km from the town of La Massana.

Traditions
A fiesta is held every 10 July, and by tradition the priest blesses a carriage in the village square opposite the medieval Church of St Christopher (Sant Cristòfol) who is the patron saint of the village.

Gallery

References

Populated places in Andorra
La Massana